Gabriel José Maestre Pérez (born 22 July 1986) is a Venezuelan professional boxer. As an amateur he competed at the 2012 and 2016 Summer Olympics, whilst also winning medals at the 2013 World Championships and the 2015 and 2019 Pan American Games.

Amateur career

Olympic results 
London 2012
Round of 32: Defeated Amin Ghasemipour (Iran) 13–8
Round of 16: Defeated Siphiwe Lusizi (South Africa) 18–13
Quarter-finals: Defeated by Serik Sapiyev (Kazakhstan) 20–9

Rio 2016
Round of 32: Defeated Arajik Marutjan (Germany) 2–1
Round of 16: Defeated Vincenzo Mangiacapre (Italy) WO
Quarter-finals: Defeated by Daniyar Yeleussinov (Kazakhstan) 3–0

World Championship results
Almaty 2013
Round of 32: Defeated Imre Bácskai (Hungary) 2–1
Round of 16: Defeated Ireneusz Zakrzewski (Poland) 3–0
Quarter-finals: Defeated Alexander Besputin (Russia) 3–0
Semi-finals: Defeated by Arisnoidys Despaigne (Cuba) 3–0

Doha 2015
Round of 16: Defeated by Eimantas Stanionis (Lithuania) 3–0

Pan American Games results
Toronto 2015
Quarter-finals: Defeated Roberto Queiroz (Brazil) 3–0
Semi-finals: Defeated Juan Ramón Solano (Dominican Republic) 3–0
Final: Defeated Roniel Iglesias (Cuba) 2–1

Lima 2019
Quarter-finals: Defeated Luis Miranda (Peru) 5–0
Semi–finals: Defeated by Rohan Polanco (Dominican Republic) 5–0

Professional career
On 6 July 2019, Maestre made his professional debut against Jeovanis Barraza. Maestre won via technical knockout after knocking his opponent down twice in the second round which resulted in referee, Guillermo Perez Pineda, stepping in to stop the bout. On 19 December 2019 Maestre fought in his second professional fight against Diego Gabriel Chaves of Argentina. Maestre dropped Chaves to the canvas during the opening round, after which Chaves proceeded to clinch Maestre in an attempt of prolonging the bout. Maestre took control of the fight in the fourth round and dropped his opponent multiple times, which forced the corner of Chaves to throw in the towel.

Just shy of a year after his last bout, Maestre returned to the ring against Daniel Vega Cota. Maestro secured victory by knocking out his Mexican opponent in the opening minute of the first round after landing a heavy left uppercut.

On 7 August 2021, Maestre faced Mykal Fox for the vacant WBA interim welterweight title. Maestre was dropped in the second round by a left hook, and was seemingly outboxed through 12 rounds by his opponent. However, he was awarded with a highly controversial unanimous decision victory, with scores of 115-112, 117-110 and 114-113 all in his favor. There was outrage over the decision, with promoter Lou DiBella calling for a "federal investigation of boxing and the WBA".

Professional boxing record

Notes

References

External links 

 
 
 
 

1986 births
Living people
People from Barcelona, Venezuela
Welterweight boxers
Olympic boxers of Venezuela
Boxers at the 2012 Summer Olympics
Boxers at the 2016 Summer Olympics
Boxers at the 2011 Pan American Games
Boxers at the 2015 Pan American Games
Boxers at the 2019 Pan American Games
Venezuelan male boxers
AIBA World Boxing Championships medalists
Pan American Games gold medalists for Venezuela
Pan American Games bronze medalists for Venezuela
Pan American Games medalists in boxing
South American Games gold medalists for Venezuela
South American Games medalists in boxing
Competitors at the 2018 South American Games
Medalists at the 2015 Pan American Games
Medalists at the 2019 Pan American Games
20th-century Venezuelan people
21st-century Venezuelan people